Larkin is an unincorporated community in northern Jackson County, Alabama, United States.

History
A post office operated under the name Larkin from 1894 to 1914.

References

Unincorporated communities in Alabama
Unincorporated communities in Jackson County, Alabama